Blueprint is the official student yearbook of the Georgia Institute of Technology. It was established in 1908 as The Blue Print and is the second oldest student organization on campus.

History

The first issue was edited by John G. Chapman. It was published for the Georgia School of Technology, as Georgia Institute of Technology was known at the time. It featured sections on the history of the school, the classes, sports, organizations, fraternities, and advertisements. Sections were broken up with poems inserted throughout the book.

The yearbook was first published in 1908 under the name Blue Print. The publication won some prominent awards early on, including the American Award from the National Scholastic Press Association in 1930, 1931, and 1932. The name changed to Blueprint in 1956.

Awards

Blueprint has won the following awards:
 2012: Silver Crown Award - Columbia Scholastic Press Association (CSPA)
 2012: Gold Medalist - CSPA
 2012: 12 Gold Circle Awards - CSPA
 2011: 22 Gold Circle Awards - CSPA
 2011: Bronze Medalist - CSPA
 2008: 2 Gold Circle Awards - CSPA
 2007: 7 Gold Circle Awards - CSPA
 2005: 2 Gold Circle Awards - CSPA
 2004: Silver Medalist - CSPA
 2002: 12 Gold Circle Awards - CSPA
 2001: Pacemaker Finalist - National Scholastic Press Association/Associated Collegiate Press (ACP)
 2001: 10 Gold Circle Awards - CSPA
 2001: Gold Crown Award - CSPA
 2000: 4 Gold Circle Awards - CSPA
 2000: Silver Crown Award - CSPA
 1999: 2 Gold Circle Awards - CSPA
 1999: Silver Crown Award - CSPA
 1998: Diversity Award - College Media Advisers (CMA)
 1998: Gold Crown Award - CSPA
 1998: Gold Medalist Award - CSPA
 1997: 10 Gold Circle Awards - CSPA
 1997: Gold Crown Award - CSPA
 1996: Pacemaker Finalist - ACP
 1996: Silver Crown Award - CSPA
 1995: Pacemaker Finalist - ACP
 1994: Pacemaker Finalist - ACP
 1993: Pacemaker Finalist - ACP

References

External links

Official Website

Georgia Tech
University and college mass media in the United States
Yearbooks